Beyond the Sea (translit. Me'ever Layam, also known as Over the Ocean) is a 1991 Israeli drama film directed by Jacob Goldwasser. It stars Aryeh Moskona, Dafna Rechter, Moti Giladi, and Mili Avital.  Yair Lapid, who later became Prime Minister of Israel, was also in the cast.  The film, a family drama set in the 1960s, was critically acclaimed, and won the Ophir Award for Best Film. The film was selected as the Israeli entry for the Best Foreign Language Film at the 64th Academy Awards, but was not accepted as a nominee.

See also
 List of submissions to the 64th Academy Awards for Best Foreign Language Film
 List of Israeli submissions for the Academy Award for Best Foreign Language Film

References

External links

 

1991 films
1991 drama films
Israeli drama films
Films set in the 1960s
1990s Hebrew-language films
Films about families